Mister Global is an annual men's beauty contest that has been held in Thailand since it was founded in 2014. The competition's inaugural edition was held in the village of Pak Chong — located some 170 kilometers (105 miles) to the northeast of Bangkok — with 16 participants. Myanmar's Myat Thuya Lwin emerged as the competition's first winner.

Since its first edition, more than 60 countries have sent their delegates to compete at the Mister Global pageant. The Mister Global Company, Ltd. licenses local organizations that wish to select the official Mister Global national contestants for their country, and approves the selection method for national representatives. Traditionally, Mister Global resides in Thailand in the duration of his reign.

Juan Carlos Ariosa of Cuba is the current Mister Global.

Titleholders

League tables

Country by number of wins

Continents by number of wins 

Notes

List of special awards winners

Mister Global Teen

Titleholders

League tables

Country by number of wins

Continents by number of wins

List of special awards winners

Mister Global and Mister Global Teen Organization 
The following is a list of all Mister Global and Mister Global Teen Organization titleholders from the founding of each pageant until now.

Regional titles 
These national titles lead winners entry into Mister Global

Mister Brazil
Mister Cambodia
Mister Chile
Mister China
Mister Czech Republic
Mister Cuba
Mister Dominican Republic
Mister Ecuador
Mister Haiti
Rubaru Mister India
Mister Global Indonesia
Mister Guam
Mister Japan
Mister International Korea
Mister Lebanon
Mister Malaysia
Mister Mexico
Mister Myanmar
Mister Nepal
Mister Panamá
Mister Philippines
Mister Singapore
Mister Global South Africa
Mister Spain
Mister Sri Lanka
Mister Sweden
Mister Switzerland
Mister Global Thailand
Mister Global USA
Mister Venezuela
Mister Vietnam

These national titles lead winners entry into Mister Global Teen

 Mister Global Teen Azerbaijan
 Mister Global Teen Australia
 Mister Global Teen Brazil
 Mister Global Teen China
 Mister Global Teen Guam
 Rubaru Mister Teen India
 Mister Global Teen Indonesia
 Mister Global Teen Korea
 Mister Global Teen Nepal
 Mister Global Teen Myanmar
 Mister Global Teen Malaysia
 Mister Global Teen Singapore
 Mister Teen Sri Lanka
 Mister Global Teen Thailand
 Mister Global Teen Vietnam

See also 
 Manhunt International
 Mister World
 Mister International
 Mister Supranational
 Man of the World

References

External links
Official Website
Official Instagram 
Official Facebook
Official Youtube

Mister Global
Mister Global Teen
Mister Global Organization
International beauty pageants
Recurring events established in 2014
Beauty pageants in Thailand
2014 establishments in Thailand
2014 in Thailand
2014 beauty pageants
Male beauty pageants
Beauty pageants for youth